The Parliament of the Kingdom of Laos was the bicameral legislature of the Kingdom of Laos from 1947 to 1975. It consisted of the National Assembly, whose members were popularly elected, and the Royal Council, whose members were appointed by the King or elected by the National Assembly. The last elections to the National Assembly took place in 1972.

Royal Council
The Royal Council or King's Council, Thipuksa Phramahakaxat, reviewed the legislations approved by the National Assembly. It had 12 appointed members. Six members were appointed by the King of Laos and six were nominated by the National Assembly. The President of the council was the presiding officer. The chamber was responsible for scrutinizing bills approved by the National Assembly, and advising the King on the approval of the bills.

National Assembly
The National Assembly, Sapha Haeng Xat, had 60 members elected in popular elections. The legislative term was five years. The President of the National Assembly was the presiding officer. According to the Constitution of the Kingdom of Laos, National Assembly was the supreme legislative body.

See also
Kingdom of Laos
List of legislatures by country

References

History of Laos (1945–present)
Kingdom of Laos
Defunct bicameral legislatures
Defunct national legislatures
1947 establishments in Laos
1975 disestablishments in Laos